South Brunswick High School can refer to:

South Brunswick High School (New Jersey)
South Brunswick High School (North Carolina)